Nenad Peruničić (born 1 May 1971) is a Serbian handball coach and former player.

Club career
Born in Pljevlja, Peruničić made his senior debut with Jugović in the Yugoslav Championship, before moving to Crvena zvezda in 1990. He spent three seasons with the Belgrade club, most notably losing the championship final to Partizan in 1993. That year, Peruničić was transferred to PSG-Asnières. He would finish the 1993–94 season as the second-highest scorer in the French league.

In 1994, Peruničić moved to Spain and signed with Elgorriaga Bidasoa. He helped the club win the Liga ASOBAL and EHF Champions League in his debut season. Over the next two years, Peruničić added three more trophies to his collection, including the EHF Cup Winners' Cup (1996–97).

Between 1997 and 2001, Peruničić spent four seasons with THW Kiel and won three consecutive doubles (1998, 1999, and 2000). He also helped the club win the EHF Cup in his first year. After leaving Kiel, Peruničić moved to SC Magdeburg, winning his second European title in 2002. He would miss the majority of the 2003–04 season due to shoulder injury.

In the 2004–05 season, Peruničić played for SG Wallau-Massenheim, before going to Qatar in April 2005. He would also play for Pick Szeged (2005–06) and Barcelona (2006–07). After a brief spell at Algeciras, Peruničić returned to Crvena zvezda in November 2007, immediately helping the club win the league title. He subsequently joined Montenegrin side Budućnost Podgorica and helped them win their first championship title in 2009.

In early 2015, Peruničić came out of retirement to help Crvena zvezda stave-off relegation from the Super League.

International career
At international level, Peruničić represented FR Yugoslavia in six major tournaments, winning two bronze medals (1996 European Championship and 1999 World Championship). He also participated in the 2000 Summer Olympics.

Coaching career
In November 2011, Peruničić replaced Igor Butulija as head coach of Crvena zvezda. He spent seven years in charge, before resigning from his position in February 2019.

In September 2018, Peruničić was appointed as head coach for Serbia. He coached the team at two major tournaments.

Personal life
Peruničić is the younger brother of fellow handball player Predrag Peruničić.

In 2002, Peruničić obtained German citizenship.

Honours

Player
Elgorriaga Bidasoa
 Liga ASOBAL: 1994–95
 Copa del Rey: 1995–96
 Supercopa ASOBAL: 1995–96
 EHF Champions League: 1994–95
 EHF Cup Winners' Cup: 1996–97
THW Kiel
 Handball-Bundesliga: 1997–98, 1998–99, 1999–2000
 DHB-Pokal: 1997–98, 1998–99, 1999–2000
 DHB-Supercup: 1998
 EHF Cup: 1997–98
SC Magdeburg
 DHB-Supercup: 2001
 EHF Champions League: 2001–02
 EHF Supercup: 2001, 2002
Pick Szeged
 Magyar Kupa: 2005–06
Barcelona
 Copa del Rey: 2006–07
 Supercopa ASOBAL: 2006–07
Crvena zvezda
 Serbian Handball Super League: 2007–08
Budućnost Podgorica
 Montenegrin Men's Handball First League: 2008–09

Coach
Crvena zvezda
 Serbian Handball Cup: 2016–17
 Serbian Handball Super Cup: 2017

References

External links
 MKSZ record
 Olympic record
 
 

1971 births
Living people
Sportspeople from Pljevlja
Serbs of Montenegro
Naturalized citizens of Germany
Serbian male handball players
Yugoslav male handball players
Competitors at the 1991 Mediterranean Games
Mediterranean Games medalists in handball
Mediterranean Games gold medalists for Yugoslavia
Olympic handball players of Yugoslavia
Handball players at the 2000 Summer Olympics
RK Jugović players
RK Crvena zvezda players
THW Kiel players
SC Magdeburg players
SC Pick Szeged players
FC Barcelona Handbol players
Liga ASOBAL players
Handball-Bundesliga players
Expatriate handball players
Serbia and Montenegro expatriate sportspeople in France
Serbia and Montenegro expatriate sportspeople in Spain
Serbia and Montenegro expatriate sportspeople in Germany
Serbia and Montenegro expatriate sportspeople in Qatar
Serbia and Montenegro expatriate sportspeople in Hungary
Serbian handball coaches
Handball coaches of international teams
Competitors at the 1990 Goodwill Games
Goodwill Games medalists in handball